The 2013–14 season was the 89th season in Rayo's history and the 15th in the top-tier.

Squad
As June, 2014..

Squad and statistics

|}

Transfers

Competitions

Overall

La Liga

League table

Matches
Kickoff times are in CET.

Copa del Rey

Round of 32

Round of 16

References

Rayo Vallecano seasons
Rayo